Global politics, also known as world politics, names both the discipline that studies the political and economic patterns of the world and the field that is being studied. At the centre of that field are the different processes of political globalization in relation to questions of social power.

The discipline studies the relationships between cities, nation-states, shell-states, multinational corporations, non-governmental organizations and international organizations. Current areas of discussion include national and ethnic conflict regulation, democracy and the politics of national self-determination, globalization and its relationship to democracy, conflict and peace studies, comparative politics, political economy, and the international political economy of the environment. One important area of global politics is contestation in the global political sphere over legitimacy.

Global politics is said by some to be distinct from the field of international politics (commonly seen as a branch of international relations), as it "does not stress the primacy of intergovernmental relations and transactions". This distinction however has not always been held among authors and political scientists, who often use the term "international politics" to mean global politics.

Defining the field
Beginning in the late nineteenth century, several groups extended the definition of the political community beyond nation-states to include much, if not all, of humanity. These internationalists include Marxists, human rights advocates, environmentalists, peace activists, feminists, and minority groups. This was the general direction of thinking on global politics, though the term was not used as such. The way in which modern world politics is implemented is structured by a set of interpretations dating back to the rise of the European powers. They were able to overtake the rest of the world in terms of economic and military power. Europeans, with their global supremacy, imposed their own system and views on others, through envisioning the world as a whole and defining the regions of the world as ‘modern’ or ‘backward’. They saw nation statehood as the best and highest form of political organization, therefore viewing world politics as the result of the pursuit of hegemony by competing states. 

The modern world politics perspective is often identified with the works, in particular their 1972 work Transnational Relations and World Politics. Here, the authors argued that state-centric views of international relations were inadequate frameworks to utilize in political science or international relations studies due to the increased globalization. Today, the practices of global politics are defined by values: norms of human rights, ideas of human development, and beliefs such as Internationalism or cosmopolitanism about how we should relate to each. Over the last couple of decades cosmopolitanism has become one of the key contested ideologies of global politics:

The intensification of globalization led some writers to suggest that states were no longer relevant to global politics. This view has been subject to debate:

See also 
 Anti-globalization movement
 Global citizenship
 Global governance
 World society

References

Notes

Further reading
 Held, David, Anthony McGrew, David Goldblatt and Jonathan Perraton, Global Transformations: Politics, Economy and Culture, Cambridge, Polity Press, 1999.
 McGrew, AG, and Lewis, PG, Global Politics, Cambridge, Polity Press, 1992.

External links

Global Power Barometer
Center for Global Politics
Berlin Forum on Global Politics

 
Cultural globalization